Cannon Ball is a wooden roller coaster at Lake Winnepesaukah amusement park. Designed by John C. Allen and built by Philadelphia Toboggan Company (today called Philadelphia Toboggan Coasters), the roller coaster opened in 1967 and quickly became one of the signature attractions at the park. It is one of two roller coasters at the park.

References

External links
Lake Winnepesaukah Amusement Park
Coaster Grotto: statistics and pics

Wooden roller coasters
Roller coasters in Georgia (U.S. state)
Roller coasters introduced in 1967